Trancers III (also released as Trancers 3: Deth Lives!) is a 1992 American direct-to-video science fiction action film directed by C. Courtney Joyner. It is the second sequel to Trancers, and also marks Helen Hunt's final appearance in the series.

Plot
Around 1992, Jack Deth (Tim Thomerson) is now a successful private detective, catching cheating lovers in the act. However, Jack's life with Lena (Helen Hunt) has gotten rocky and he faces divorce if he cannot clean up his act. Lena agrees to meet for supper to try fix the relationship.

Before he can mend his troubled relationship, he is jacked back up the line to 2352 by Alice (Megan Ward), to save Angel City from its future destruction in a massive Trancer war. His mission is go to 2005 and find the origin of this new wave of Trancers and end it with extreme prejudice. The only problem is that Lena, now remarried, is the only tie to Angel City's impending doom.

Jack learns that the U.S. government has sponsored a new Trancer training program, run by the maniacal Colonel Daddy Muthuh (Andrew Robinson). With the help of R.J. (Melanie Smith), a camp escapee and Shark (R. A. Mihailoff), a crystal-powered mandroid sent by Ruthie Raines (Telma Hopkins), Deth decides to find a way inside the Trancer program and shut it down for good.

While Lena accepts his explanation of why he missed the dinner, she is happy with her life and asks Deth not to use time travel to go back change history so he is present at the date.

Jack returns to 2352

Cast
 Tim Thomerson as Jack Deth
 Helen Hunt as Lena Deth
 Melanie Smith as R.J.
 Andrew Robinson as Colonel Daddy Muthuh
 Telma Hopkins as Ruthie Raines, The Engineer
 Megan Ward as Alice Stillwell Deth
 Stephen Macht as Harris
 R.A. Mihailoff as "Shark"

Reception
While praising Thomerson performance and finding the special effects impressive for the film's low budget, Entertainment Weekly found the film overall to be needlessly confusing, giving the film a "C" grade.

TV Guide found the movie to be an improvement over the previous sequel, also noting Thomerson's performance. It also praises the writing, direction and effects, but notes a certain misogynic feel as most minor female characters in the film die violent deaths. In total TV Guide recommend the film as an above average example of the genre.

Likewise, The Encyclopedia of Science Fiction found this entry to be superior to the previous sequel.

However, Creature Feature gave the film 2 out of five stars, finding it the least interesting sequel.

Production
Thomerson campaigned for Joyner to direct the film, and Joyner found Thomerson great to work with. Joyner asked Albert Band for advice at times during the filming.

The film was shot in Los Angeles.

Producer Band was pleased that Helen Hunt agreed to return for the film, as by the time of filming she had become a well known star on Mad About You. Writer/Director Courtney also praised Hunt's work and dedication to the film.

References

External links
 

1992 independent films
1992 films
1990s science fiction action films
American independent films
American science fiction action films
1990s English-language films
Direct-to-video sequel films
Films about time travel
Films set in the 23rd century
Trancers (film series)
1990s American films